The canton of Moûtiers is an administrative division of the Savoie department, southeastern France. Its borders were modified at the French canton reorganisation which came into effect in March 2015. Its seat is in Moûtiers.

It consists of the following communes:

Les Allues
Les Avanchers-Valmorel
Les Belleville
Bozel
Brides-les-Bains
Champagny-en-Vanoise
Courchevel
Feissons-sur-Salins
Grand-Aigueblanche 
Hautecour
La Léchère
Montagny
Moûtiers
Notre-Dame-du-Pré
Planay
Pralognan-la-Vanoise
Saint-Marcel
Salins-Fontaine

References

Cantons of Savoie